Central library and documents center of University of Tehran is the biggest academic library in Iran. It was built in 1350.

Building 
It has 9 stories and 22000 square meters area, its construction material is armed concrete. Its design is based on modern architecture.

Manuscripts 
Among manuscripts there is Khamsa of Nizami, Shahnameh, Vendidad, Zakhireye Khwarazmshahi, Book of Roads and Kingdoms, the oldest manuscript being a copy of مجمل اللغه from Ibn Faris.

Digital library 
In 2020, the library published 41000 doctorate, and masters dissertations, Digital library includes 12000 manuscripts for free download.

Other university libraries 
University of Tehran has 60 libraries. Council of administration has five subcommittees. Every researcher, students from other universities, are allowed to use this library's resources. It is a member of Iranian national committee of world memory, Content national consortium,  and International Federation of Library Associations and Institutions.

Administrators 

 Iraj Afshar
 Abolfazl Ghasemi
 Ismaeil Hakemi vala
 Mohammadmehdi Jafari
 Firooz Harirchi

References

Libraries in Iran
University of Tehran